Driver Controlled Operation, similar to Driver Only Operation (DOO) is where the driver for a train carries out all the essential roles needed to operate a train. The main difference to DOO is that other members of staff also work on board, for example revenue collectors.

Currently only around 30% of Britain’s journeys are either DCO or DOO meaning the remainder require a guard to operate and thus if there is no available guard the service would this be cancelled. DCO means only the unavailability of a driver would lead to a cancellation of a train.

Railways using DCO 
A deal agreed between Greater Anglia (train operating company) and RMT union meant that all of their Intercity and Regional services would change to DCO, however unlike other DCO in place in the UK, a guard could still operate the doors in exceptional circumstances and must still be present in order for the service to run. The only exceptions are on Intercity services between Liverpool Street and Ipswich, and Regional Services between Ely and Stansted Airport, where trains were already cleared to run without guards.  Arriva Rail North were also hoping to agree a similar deal, however this was not achieved and on 1 March 2020 the Department for Transport took over operations as Northern Trains, who are also looking to implement DCO, so could be implemented in the future.

Other examples of DCO within the UK includes Abellio ScotRail and Southern and Southeastern longer distance routes and services.

South Western Railway are planning to implement DCO on London suburban services for when its new fleet of British Rail Class 701 trains arrive. The RMT has opposed to these changes and have held various strikes on many occasions including 27 days in December 2019. 

In April 2021 a deal was agreed between South Western Railway and RMT. Whilst South Western Railway claimed to have implemented a DCO method of working on their inner suburban routes, unlike Southern however, the guard would still be an essential crew member on the train and would be required onboard each service in order for it to run.

References

Transport operations
Rail transport operations